Peter Eriksson (born 18 May 1969) is a retired Swedish footballer. During his club career, Eriksson played for IFK Göteborg, BK Häcken, Dalian Wanda and BK Forward. He made one appearance for the Sweden national team.

Honours

Allsvenskan: 1990, 1991, 1993, 1994, 1995, 1996

Svenska Cupen: 1992-93

External links

 

1969 births
Living people
Swedish footballers
Association football midfielders
BK Häcken players
Dalian Shide F.C. players
IFK Göteborg players
BK Forward players
Sweden international footballers